Kakod is a town and a nagar panchayat in Bulandshahr district in the Indian state of Uttar Pradesh.

Politics
As of 2016, the Chairman of this Nagar Panchayat Mr. Rizwan.

Demographics
At the 2001 India census, Kakore had a population of 7,119. Males constitute 53% of the population and females 47%. Kakore has an average literacy rate of 43%, lower than the national average of 59.5%: male literacy is 53%, and female literacy is 33%. In Kakore, 22% of the population is under 6 years of age.

References

Cities and towns in Gautam Buddh Nagar district